Gregory Blakemoor Norton (born July 6, 1972) is an American former professional baseball corner infielder. He spent 13 years in Major League Baseball (MLB) with six teams from 1996 through 2009. Since his retirement as a player, he has worked in the minor league system of the Florida Marlins, served as a coach for Auburn University, and was the minor league hitting coordinator for the Boston Red Sox.

Early life
Born in San Leandro, California, Norton attended the University of Oklahoma. In 1992, he played collegiate summer baseball with the Chatham A's of the Cape Cod Baseball League and was named a league all-star. Norton's father Jerry was arrested and later convicted of murder after the 1989 strangulation death of his wife. Jerry Norton was later sentenced to 25 years to life in prison.

Professional career

Chicago White Sox
Norton made his major league debut on August 18,  for the Chicago White Sox, entering the game against the Milwaukee Brewers in the eighth inning as a pinch-runner for designated hitter Harold Baines. He would score his first run three batters later on a two-out RBI single by left fielder Tony Phillips. Norton would get his first major league base hit the very next night against the Detroit Tigers, when he singled against reliever José Lima as a pinch-hitter.

Colorado Rockies
Playing for the Colorado Rockies from the  season until , Norton compiled a .252 batting average in 344 games played. Norton played four positions for the Rockies his first year with the team, including starting at first base for All-Star Todd Helton for the only five games Helton rested that year. In his final year with the Rockies, Norton led the majors in successful pinch hits and pinch-hit RBI. However, he was granted free agency at the end of the 2003 season.

Detroit Tigers
 was a forgettable year for Norton, as he split time with the Detroit Tigers and their minor-league team in Toledo. Tigers first baseman Carlos Peña led the team in home runs that year, leaving very little room for Norton. A knee inflammation also kept him on the disabled list for over a month.

Tampa Bay Devil Rays

On January 11, Norton signed a minor league contract with the Tampa Bay Devil Rays. He was brought up to the majors on April 26 when Jorge Cantú was placed on the disabled list. In Norton's first year as a D-Ray, he bested his season home run total (17) and started a career high 26 games in right field. He missed making the  Opening Day roster while going under the knife to surgically repair his right knee. On Mother's Day, May 14, 2006, Norton was one of more than 50 hitters who brandished a pink bat to benefit the Breast Cancer Foundation.

Seattle Mariners
On February 13, Norton signed a minor league contract with an invitation to spring training with the Seattle Mariners. He was purchased from the minors and added to the active roster on April 11,  when Charlton Jimerson was designated for assignment. On April 30, Norton was designated for assignment despite batting .438 in 16 at-bats.

Atlanta Braves

On May 5, Norton was traded to the Atlanta Braves for cash considerations. In 2008, Norton led the major leagues in pinch hit home runs, with three. On December 19, 2008, Norton signed a one-year contract worth $800,000 to return to the Braves. In 2009, he collected only 11 hits in 76 at-bats with Atlanta.

Coaching career
Norton began a coaching career within the Florida Marlins farm system in 2010, acting as hitting coach and then manager of the New Orleans Zephyrs. In July 2013, he was named hitting coach for the Auburn Tigers baseball program. Norton left his position in the Marlins organization to join coach Sunny Golloway at Auburn. In January 2016, Norton was hired by the Boston Red Sox to be the team's minor league hitting coordinator. The Red Sox declined to renew Norton's contract after the 2021 season.

References

External links
, or Pura Pelota website

1972 births
Living people
Atlanta Braves players
Baseball players from California
Birmingham Barons players
Charlotte Knights players
Chatham Anglers players
Chicago White Sox players
Colorado Rockies players
Colorado Springs Sky Sox players
Detroit Tigers players
Durham Bulls players
Gulf Coast White Sox players
Gwinnett Braves players
Hickory Crawdads players
Major League Baseball designated hitters
Major League Baseball first basemen
Major League Baseball outfielders
Major League Baseball third basemen
Minor league baseball coaches
Minor league baseball managers
Montgomery Biscuits players
Nashville Sounds players
Oklahoma Sooners baseball players
People from San Leandro, California
Seattle Mariners players
South Bend Silver Hawks players
Tacoma Rainiers players
Tampa Bay Devil Rays players
Tiburones de La Guaira players
American expatriate baseball players in Venezuela
University of Oklahoma alumni
Auburn Tigers baseball coaches